The St. Mark's School is a band 1 school located in the Eastern District of Hong Kong.

History
St. Mark's School was founded at Glenealy in Central in 1949, first known as St. Paul's English PM School. The founding Principal was Mr. Leslie Wah-Leung Chung (1917-2009)  

. It was renamed St. Mark's School in 1953, and moved to Shaukeiwan Road in 1956. In 2001, it was relocated to its present site, a brand new building in Aldrich Bay.

In 2009, St. Mark's celebrated its Diamond Jubilee.

The Parish Church of this school is the Holy Nativity Church.

School logo and motto
The logo of St. Mark's School is a lion with outstretched wings, a symbol of the undaunted spirit of St. Mark. The ribbon beneath the feet of the winged lion carries the Greek word "ΕΥΘΥΣ", which translates as "straightway" in old English.

"Straightway" has a two-fold meaning. Character-wise, it means one should be honest, frank, and morally upright. It also means straight-away, doing at once what should be done now and not putting it off.

Students of St. Mark's School are reminded to always be truthful to others, as well as be ready to take up responsibilities and act immediately.

Academics
St. Mark's School adopts English as the medium of instruction. With the exception of several subjects, the entire curriculum is taught in English. These exceptions are: Chinese Language, Chinese Literature, Chinese History, and Religious Education. St. Mark's School is regarded as one of the top schools in the Eastern District, with students achieving excellent results in public examinations. It is also one of the 22 members of the Council of Subsidised Schools in Hong Kong.

Extracurricular activities
There are 5 houses in St. Mark's School, namely Venus, Jupiter, Saturn, Mars and Mercury. There are various inter-house sports competitions over the academic year as well as the annual Sports Day and Swimming Gala. In addition, students are encouraged to enrol in many different student societies and to take up numerous leadership roles.

References

Secondary schools in Hong Kong
Shau Kei Wan
Anglican schools in Hong Kong
1949 establishments in Hong Kong